Dipterygina is a genus of moths of the family Noctuidae.

Species
 Dipterygina babooni (Bethune-Baker, 1906)
 Dipterygina cupreotincta Sugi, 1954
 Dipterygina dorsipallens (Holloway, 1976)
 Dipterygina indica (Moore, 1867)
 Dipterygina japonica (Leech, 1889)
 Dipterygina kebeae (Bethune-Baker, 1906)
 Dipterygina major Holloway, 1989
 Dipterygina obscurior (Warren, 1913)
 Dipterygina vagivitta (Walker, 1862)

References
Natural History Museum Lepidoptera genus database
Dipterygina at funet

Hadeninae
Noctuoidea genera